Dorothee Schneider (born 17 February 1969) is a German dressage rider competing at Olympic level. On 7 August 2012 Schneider was a member of the team which won the silver medal in the team dressage event.

On 12 August 2016 she was a member of the team which won the gold medal in the team dressage event at the 2016 Summer Olympics.

International Championship results

Notable Horses 

 Diva Royal – 2002 Black Hanoverian Mare (Don Frederico x Warkant)
 2012 London Olympics – Team Silver Medal, Individual Seventh Place
  Sezuan   - 2009 Black Danish Warmblood Stallion (Blue Hors Zack x Don Schufro)
 2014, 15 and 16 he won Gold at the World Championships for Young Dressage Horses, as the first stallion ever, three times in a row under Dorothee Schneider
 Showtime FRH – 2006 Dark Bay Hanoverian Gelding (Sandro Hit x Rotspon)
 2016 Rio Olympics – Team Gold Medal, Individual Sixth Place
 Sammy Davis Jr. – 2006 Black German Sport Horse Gelding (San Remo x Wenckstern)
 2017 European Championships – Team Gold Medal, Individual 11th Place
 2018 FEI World Cup Final – Fifth Place
 Sisters Act OLD Vom Rosencarree – 2012 Dark Bay Oldenburg Mare (Sandro Hit x Royal Diamond 5)
 2017 FEI Dressage Young Horse World Championships – Fourth Place

References

External links 
 
 
 

Living people
1969 births
Sportspeople from Mainz
German female equestrians
German dressage riders
Olympic equestrians of Germany
Equestrians at the 2012 Summer Olympics
Equestrians at the 2016 Summer Olympics
Equestrians at the 2020 Summer Olympics
Olympic silver medalists for Germany
Olympic medalists in equestrian
Olympic gold medalists for Germany
Medalists at the 2012 Summer Olympics
Medalists at the 2016 Summer Olympics
Medalists at the 2020 Summer Olympics